Ron O'Dwyer (born 5 February 1938) is a former Australian rules footballer who played with Carlton and Collingwood in the Victorian Football League (VFL).

Originally from Broken Hill, O'Dwyer was a rover and played 10 of his 13 games for Carlton in the 1957 season.

He transferred to Collingwood for the 1959 season but again only appeared sporadically. In 1960 he participated in Collingwood's final series and was in their grand final losing team.

In 1962 he joined Western District Football League club Heywood, as senior coach. He played for Sandringham in 1966 and 1967.

O'Dwyer is now the President of a past players association called "AFL X-Men".

References

1938 births
Living people
Australian rules footballers from New South Wales
Carlton Football Club players
Collingwood Football Club players
Sandringham Football Club players
North Broken Hill Football Club players